Wesley Deshawn Iwundu (born December 20, 1994) is an American professional basketball player for the Stockton Kings of the NBA G League. He played college basketball for the Kansas State Wildcats.

College career
Iwundu was recruited by coach Bruce Weber to Kansas State out of Westfield High School in Houston. He would go on to be a starter from the beginning, breaking the Wildcats' career record for games started with 124. He came in as a part of a heralded 5-man 2013 recruiting class, but ultimately was the only player who stayed at K-State past two seasons.

His perseverance paid off, as he was named third-team All-Big 12 Conference in both his junior and senior seasons. For his senior season, Iwundu averaged 13.0 points, 6.3 rebounds and 3.5 assists per game.

Professional career

Orlando Magic (2017–2020)
Following the closure of his college career, Iwundu was invited to the 2017 NBA Draft Combine. In the 2017 NBA draft, Iwundu was taken in the second round by the Orlando Magic with the 33rd pick, thus becoming the first Kansas State player to be taken in an NBA Draft since Michael Beasley and Bill Walker in 2008. Iwundu signed a three-year contract worth a total of $4,046,762.

Dallas Mavericks (2020–2021)
On December 1, 2020, Iwundu signed with the Dallas Mavericks.

New Orleans Pelicans (2021)
On March 26, 2021, Iwundu was traded, alongside James Johnson and a second-round draft-pick, to the New Orleans Pelicans in exchange for JJ Redick and Nicolò Melli.

On August 7, 2021, Iwundu was traded to the Charlotte Hornets and was later waived prior to the start of the season.

Atlanta Hawks (2021–2022)
On December 23, 2021, Iwundu signed a 10-day contract with the Atlanta Hawks. scoring 12 points in his last game matching 3rd career point high.

Cleveland Charge (2022)
On January 25, 2022, Iwundu was acquired off waivers by the Cleveland Charge. However, he was waived on April 1 after suffering a season-ending injury.

Stockton Kings (2022–present)
Iwundu was signed to the Portland Trail Blazers on September 23, 2022 on a training camp contract. He was waived on October 7. On November 3, 2022, Iwundu was named to the opening night roster for the Stockton Kings.

Career statistics

NBA

Regular season

|-
| style="text-align:left;"| 
| style="text-align:left;"| Orlando
| 62 || 12 || 16.5 || .427 || .196 || .723 || 2.2 || .9 || .5 || .2 || 3.7
|-
| style="text-align:left;"| 
| style="text-align:left;"| Orlando
| 68 || 13 || 18.1 || .412 || .367 || .816 || 2.7 || 1.1 || .4 || .3 || 5.0
|-
| style="text-align:left;"| 
| style="text-align:left;"| Orlando
| 52 || 21 || 18.3 || .416 || .341 || .804 || 2.5 || 1.2 || .5 || .3 || 5.8
|-
| style="text-align:left;" rowspan=2| 
| style="text-align:left;"| Dallas
| 23 || 3 || 12.5 || .327 || .130 || .857 || 2.9 || .4 || .4 || .1 || 2.1
|-
| style="text-align:left;"| New Orleans
| 18 || 1 || 13.9 || .340 || .111 || .824 || 2.6 || .4 || .3 || .1 || 2.8
|-
| style="text-align:left;"| 
| style="text-align:left;"| Atlanta
| 3 || 1 || 27.3 || .444 || .600 || .750 || 4.3 || .0 || .3 || .0 || 7.3
|- class="sortbottom"
| style="text-align:center;" colspan="2"| Career
| 226 || 51 || 16.9 || .408 || .292 || .798 || 2.5 || .9 || .5 || .2 || 4.4

Playoffs

|-
| style="text-align:left;"|2019
| style="text-align:left;"|Orlando
| 5 || 0 || 12.0 || .333 || .333 || 1.000 || 1.4 || .8 || .6 || .0 || 4.8
|-
| style="text-align:left;"|2020
| style="text-align:left;"|Orlando
| 5 || 0 || 15.2 || .300 || .571 || .625 || 2.2 || .8 ||.6 || .4 || 4.2 
|- class="sortbottom"
| style="text-align:center;" colspan="2"| Career
| 10 || 0 || 13.6 || .316 || .438 || .824 || 1.8 || .8 || .6 || .2 || 4.5

NBA G League

Regular season

|-
| style="text-align:left;"| 2017–18
| style="text-align:left;"| Lakeland
| 9 || 9 || 35.3 || .405 || .125 || .755 || 8.4 || 2.0 || 1.1 || .4 || 15.2
|- class="sortbottom"
| style="text-align:center;" colspan="2"| Career
| 9 || 9 || 35.3 || .405 || .125 || .755 || 8.4 || 2.0 || 1.1 || .4 || 15.2

College

|-
| style="text-align:left;"| 2013–14
| style="text-align:left;"| Kansas State
| 33 || 32 || 23.6 || .461 || .412 || .634 || 4.2 || 1.8 || .6 || .4 || 6.7
|-
| style="text-align:left;"| 2014–15 
| style="text-align:left;"| Kansas State
| 31 || 24 || 25.2 || .404 || .316 || .595 || 3.5 || 2.0 || .7 || .6 || 5.8
|-
| style="text-align:left;"| 2015–16 
| style="text-align:left;"| Kansas State 
| 33 || 32 || 32.4 || .478 || .200 || .692 || 4.5 || 3.7 || 1.3 || .2 || 11.9
|-
| style="text-align:left;"| 2016–17
| style="text-align:left;"| Kansas State
| 35 || 35 || 31.4 || .481 || .376 || .767 || 6.3 || 3.5 || 1.0 || .3 || 13.0
|- class="sortbottom"
| style="text-align:center;" colspan="2"| Career
| 132 || 123 || 28.2 || .463 || .338 || .688 || 4.7 || 2.8 || .9 || .4 || 9.5

Personal
Iwundu has Nigerian roots. In 2021, it was reported that he was in talks with the Nigeria national basketball team to represent Nigeria in the 2024 Summer Olympics.

References

External links

Kansas State Wildcats bio

1994 births
Living people
21st-century African-American sportspeople
African-American basketball players
American men's basketball players
Atlanta Hawks players
Basketball players from Houston
Cleveland Charge players
Dallas Mavericks players
Kansas State Wildcats men's basketball players
Lakeland Magic players
New Orleans Pelicans players
Orlando Magic draft picks
Orlando Magic players
Small forwards